Hacqueville is a commune in the Eure department in north western France.

Population

Personalities
 Marc Isambart Brunel, builder of the Thames Tunnel, was born in Hacqueville in 1769.

See also
 Communes of the Eure department

References

Communes of Eure